Eitan is the Hebrew source of the male given name Ethan, and roughly translates to "spiritual strength". 

Eitan may also refer to:

People

First name
Eitan Avitsur (born 1941), Israeli composer
Eitan Ben Eliyahu (born 1944), Israeli general
Eitan Berglas (1934–1992), Israeli economist
Eitan Bernath (born 2002), American celebrity chef, entertainer, author, and TV personality
Eitan Broshi (born 1950), Israeli politician 
Eitan Cabel (born 1959), Israeli politician
Eitan Freilich (born 1993), international celebrity 
Eitan Friedlander (born 1958), Israeli Olympic sailor
Eitan Haber (born 1940), Israeli journalist
Eitan Livni (1919–1991), Israeli activist and politician
Eitan Reiter
Eitan Tibi (born 1987), Israeli football player
[Eitan Moskowitz]

Surname
Michael Eitan (born 1944), Israeli politician
 Or Eitan (born 1981), Israeli basketball player
Rafael Eitan (1929–2004), Israeli general and politician
Rafi Eitan (1926–2019), Israeli politician

Places
Avnei Eitan, Israel
Eitan, Israel
Neve Eitan, Israel
Eitanim

Military
IAI Eitan, an Israeli reconnaissance unmanned air vehicle
Eitan AFV, an Israeli armoured fighting vehicle
2014 Israel–Gaza conflict or Miv'tza Tzuk Eitan, a military operation launched by Israel on 8 July 2014 in the Hamas-ruled Gaza Strip

See also
Ethan (disambiguation)
Ethan (given name)
Etan (disambiguation)
Ethen (disambiguation)